John Gordon Elliott  (5 November 1938 – 12 July 2022) was a New Zealand politician of the National Party.

Biography

Early life and career 
Elliott was born in 1938 in Whangārei. He received his education at Kamo Primary School, Whangarei Boys' High School and at the University of Auckland. He obtained an MA (Hons) in 1973 and a diploma in teaching. He was a teacher from 1959 until 1975 and started at his own high school in Whangārei. For his last two years in the profession, he was deputy principal of Bayfield School.

In 1966, he married Jillian Margaret Mullenger. They had two sons.

Political career 

He won the Whangarei electorate from Murray Robert Smith in 1975 and was re-elected in 1978, but failed to win the reselection by the National Party in 1981, who instead chose John Banks. Instead, Elliot stood in the New Lynn electorate as an independent in the 1981 election against the incumbent from the Labour Party, Jonathan Hunt, but he was unsuccessful.

Later life and death 
In 1989, Elliott launched his newsletter business. which included the monthly publication Ponsonby Community Newsletter. He ran the business under Bayfield Services Limited. In 2004, Elliott sold the publication to publisher Martin Leach, who changed the name to Ponsonby News.

Elliott died on 12 July 2022. At the time of his death, he was a member of the Green Party.

Honours and awards 
In 1977, Elliott was awarded the Queen Elizabeth II Silver Jubilee Medal, and in 1990 he received the New Zealand 1990 Commemoration Medal.

Elliott was awarded the Queen's Service Medal in the 2019 New Year Honours, for services to the community.

Notes

References 

 
 

1938 births
2022 deaths
New Zealand National Party MPs
Members of the New Zealand House of Representatives
New Zealand MPs for North Island electorates
Unsuccessful candidates in the 1981 New Zealand general election
New Zealand educators
People educated at Whangarei Boys' High School
Recipients of the Queen's Service Medal
People from Whangārei